Jorge Alcalde Lagranja (August 19, 1968) is a Spanish journalist, science advocate and writer. He was the director of Quo magazine from 2007 until 2019. He is currently director of Esquire, since 2017, and collaborator of COPE programs. He graduated in Information Sciences at the Complutense University of Madrid and is also a graduate in communication from the University of South Florida (Tampa).

History 
Jorge Alcalde is an advocate of science in the press, radio, and television, and was the editor-in-chief of Muy Interesante. He has also worked for the magazines Tiempo, GEO, and El Europeo . On the other hand, he has participated in various television programs and in newspapers such as El Mundo and ABC.

In addition to managing the Quo magazine, he is a regular contributor to the COPE network, where he returned in office in 2012 after collaborating for three seasons in esRadio. He combines both tasks with his usual collaboration in La Razón and maintained a weekly column in Libertad Digital. He was also the director and presenter of the TV programs Factor 2.1 and Vive la Ciencia (Libertad Digital TV).

Since October 2017, he has directed the Spanish edition of the men's magazine Esquire, edited by Hearst Spain, a subsidiary of the Hearst Corporation.

He has participated in the start-up of several science museums in Spain and is the author of several books.

Published books 

 Jorge Alcalde Lagranja ( 2005 ). The lights of energy, Ed. Fundación Iberdrola. 292 p. 
 Jorge Alcalde Lagranja ( 2007 ). The lies of climate change, Ed. LibrosLibres. 211 p. 
 Jorge Alcalde Lagranja ( 2009 ). The lies of the paranormal: What is learned from science investigating the mysteries of the "dark zone", Ed. Libroslibres. 204 p. 
 Jorge Alcalde Lagranja ( 2010 ). I need you, dad, a reflection for future parents, happy parents and parents who are not allowed to be, Ed. Libroslibres. 190 p. 
 Jorge Alcalde Lagranja ( 2011 ). The night of the king, Ed. Today's Topics. 411 p. 
 Jorge Alcalde Lagranja ( 2015 ). Why don't astronauts cry? Ed. Planet. 317p. 
 Jorge Alcalde Lagranja ( 2017 ). Archimedes, the theorem, Ed. Planeta. 288p.

Awards and honors 
He has received several prizes for broadcasting such as the Prism of the Casa de las Ciencias de La Coruña, and the FECYT and TECNALIA  prizes for scientific journalism. He has been a qualifier for the Boehringer Ingelheim prize for health journalism.

References

External links 
 Profile on Twitter.
 Profile on LinkedIn.
 QUO.es website.

Spanish journalists
1968 births
21st-century Spanish writers
Living people